The 4R03 was a 4-speed automatic transmission from Nissan Motor Company, Ltd.'s Jatco subsidiary.

Specifications

Gear ratios

Applications
1990–2001 Infiniti Q45
1989–1996 Nissan 300ZX Twin-Turbo
1995–1999 Nissan Cedric Y33
Nissan Patrol (Y60) 1987–1997.
Nissan Patrol (Y61) 1997–2010.
RD28ETi
TB45E
ZD30DDTi
1990–1995 Mazda Eunos Cosmo (With 20B-REW Engine, as the Mazda Q4A-EL)

See also
 List of Jatco transmissions

4R03